Rafael Batista Sánchez (November 12, 1945 – October 25, 2008) was a first baseman in Major League Baseball. He was born in San Pedro de Macorís, Dominican Republic.

Batista was signed by the Milwaukee Braves as an amateur free agent before the 1965 season, and drafted by the Houston Astros from the Atlanta Braves in the 1967 minor league draft (November 28, 1967).

During his two short stints with Houston, he got into a total of 22 games, mostly as a pinch hitter. He batted .280 (7–for–25) and was excellent in the field. In eight appearances at first base he recorded twenty-six putouts, one assist, no errors, and participated in one double play. In his one big league start (July 2, 1973 at the Astrodome) he went 0–for–4 against San Diego Padres starter and winner Clay Kirby. He later was acquired by the Cafeteros de Córdoba of the Mexican League before the  season, and never again played in the Major Leagues.

Batista died in Santo Domingo, Dominican Republic, at the age of 62.

References

External links
, or Retrosheet, or AlMomento.net

1945 births
2008 deaths
Acereros de Monclova players
Astros de Tampico players
Cafeteros de Córdoba players
Columbus Astros players
Dallas–Fort Worth Spurs players
Denver Bears players
Diablos Blancos de Unión Laguna players
Dominican Republic expatriate baseball players in Japan
Dominican Republic expatriate baseball players in Mexico
Dominican Republic expatriate baseball players in the United States
Estrellas Orientales players
Florida Rookie League Braves players
Houston Astros players
Iowa Oaks players
Kinston Eagles players
Lotte Orions players
Major League Baseball first basemen
Major League Baseball players from the Dominican Republic
Oklahoma City 89ers players
Sportspeople from San Pedro de Macorís
Savannah Senators players
West Palm Beach Braves players